Pulaski County is a county located in the central portion of the U.S. state of Georgia. As of the 2020 census, the population was 9,855. The county seat is Hawkinsville.

History
Pulaski County was created by an act of the Georgia General Assembly on December 13, 1808, from a portion of Laurens County. In the antebellum years, it was developed for cotton cultivation and is part of the Black Belt of Georgia, an arc of highly fertile soil.

In 1870, Dodge County was partially created from a section of Pulaski County by another legislative act. In 1912, the northwestern half of Pulaski County was used to create Bleckley County via a constitutional amendment approved by Georgia voters.

The county was named for Count Kazimierz Pułaski of Poland who fought and died for United States independence in the American Revolutionary War.

The county population fell by more than half from 1910 to 1930, as residents moved to cities. African Americans especially joined the Great Migration to northern and midwestern cities, both to gain work and to escape the Jim Crow racial oppression of the South.

Geography
The entirety of Pulaski County is located in the Lower Ocmulgee River sub-basin of the Altamaha River basin.

Major highways

  U.S. Route 129
  U.S. Route 129 Alternate
  U.S. Route 129 Business
  U.S. Route 341
  U.S. Route 341 Business
  State Route 11
  State Route 11 Business
  State Route 26
  State Route 27
  State Route 112
  State Route 230
  State Route 247
  State Route 257

Adjacent counties
 Bleckley County - northeast
 Dodge County - east
 Wilcox County - south
 Dooly County - west
 Houston County - northwest

Demographics

2020 census

As of the 2020 United States census, there were 9,855 people, 3,687 households, and 2,479 families residing in the county.

2010 census
As of the 2010 United States Census, there were 12,010 people, 4,475 households, and 3,010 families residing in the county. The racial makeup of the county was 63.9% white, 31.8% black or African American, 0.9% Asian, 0.3% American Indian, 1.9% from other races, and 1.0% from two or more races. Those of Hispanic or Latino origin made up 3.9% of the population. In terms of ancestry, 21.3% were American, 11.3% were English, 7.6% were Irish, and 6.2% were German.

Of the 4,475 households, 30.6% had children under the age of 18 living with them, 45.3% were married couples living together, 17.6% had a female householder with no husband present, 32.7% were non-families, and 29.3% of all households were made up of individuals. The average household size was 2.40 and the average family size was 2.96. The median age was 41.1 years.

The median income for a household in the county was $36,262 and the median income for a family was $46,850. Males had a median income of $34,154 versus $21,073 for females. The per capita income for the county was $16,621. About 8.5% of families and 11.6% of the population were below the poverty line, including 7.6% of those under age 18 and 10.6% of those age 65 or over.

Communities
 Hartford
 Hawkinsville (county seat)

Government and infrastructure
Pulaski County is one of only a handful of counties in Georgia with the sole commissioner form of county government, in which the county is governed by a single elected official. Georgia is the only state that permits this form of government. In 2018, Jenna Mashburn was elected to the office of sole commissioner.

The Georgia Department of Corrections operates the Pulaski State Prison in Hawkinsville.

Politics

See also

 National Register of Historic Places listings in Pulaski County, Georgia
List of counties in Georgia

References

External links
 GeorgiaInfo Pulaski County Courthouse History
 Georgia.gov info for Pulaski County
 Georgia Department of Community Affairs County Snapshots

 
Georgia (U.S. state) counties
1808 establishments in Georgia (U.S. state)
Populated places established in 1808